The following is a list of schools in the Toronto Catholic District School Board. The Toronto Catholic District School Board governs 197 schools in the Toronto area that makes up 164 elementary schools, 29 secondary schools, 2 schools that combine both elementary and secondary grades, and 2 alternative schools.

Elementary schools

 All Saints
 Annunciation
 Bishop Macdonell
 Blessed Pier Giorgio Frassati
 Blessed Sacrament
 Blessed Trinity
 Canadian Martyrs
 Cardinal Leger
 D'Arcy McGee
 Epiphany of Our Lord
 Father Serra
 Holy Angels
 Holy Child
 Holy Cross
 Holy Family
 Holy Name
 Holy Rosary
 Holy Spirit
 Immaculate Conception
 Immaculate Heart of Mary
 James Culnan
 Josyf Cardinal Slipyj
 Monsignor John Corrigan
 Mother Cabrini
 Nativity of Our Lord
 Our Lady of Fatima
 Our Lady of Grace
 Our Lady of Guadalupe
 Our Lady of Lourdes
 Our Lady of Peace
 Our Lady of Perpetual Help
 Our Lady of Sorrows
 Our Lady of the Assumption
 Our Lady of Victory
 Our Lady of Wisdom
 Pope Francis
 Precious Blood
 Prince of Peace
 Regina Mundi
 Sacred Heart
 Santa Maria
 St. Agatha
 St. Agnes
 St. Aidan
 St. Albert
 St. Alphonsus
 St. Ambrose
 St. Andre
 St. Andrew
 St. Angela
 St. Anselm
 St. Anthony
 St. Antoine Daniel
 St. Augustine
 St. Barbara
 St. Barnabas
 St. Bartholomew
 St. Bede
 St. Benedict
 St. Bernard
 St. Bonaventure
 St. Boniface
 St. Brendan
 St. Brigid
 St. Bruno / St. Raymond
 St. Catherine
 St. Cecilia
 St. Charles
 St. Charles Garnier
 St. Clare
 St. Clement
 St. Columba
 St. Conrad
 St. Cyril
 St. Demetrius
 St. Denis
 St. Dominic Savio
 St. Dorothy
 St. Dunstan
 St. Edmund Campion
 St. Edward
 St. Elizabeth
 St. Elizabeth Seton
 St. Eugene
 St. Fidelis
 St. Florence
 St. Francis Assisi
 St. Francis de Sales
 St. Francis Xavier
 St. Gabriel
 St. Gabriel Lalemant
 St. Gerald
 St. Gregory
 St. Helen
 St. Henry
 St. Ignatius of Loyola
 St. Isaac Jogues
 St. James
 St. Jane Frances
 St. Jean De Brebeuf
 St. Jerome
 St. Joachim
 St. John
 St. John Bosco
 St. John The Evangelist
 St. John Vianney
 St. John XXIII
 St. Josaphat
 St. Joseph
 St. Jude
 St. Kateri Tekakwitha
 St. Kevin
 St. Lawrence
 St. Leo
 St. Louis
 St. Luigi
 St. Malachy
 St. Marcellus
 St. Margaret
 St. Margherita of Città di Castello
 St. Marguerite Bourgeoys
 St. Maria Goretti
 St. Mark
 St. Martha
 St. Martin de Porres
 St. Mary
 St. Mary of the Angels
 St. Matthew
 St. Matthias
 St. Maurice
 St. Michael
 St. Monica
 St. Nicholas
 St. Nicholas of Bari
 St. Norbert
 St. Paschal Baylon
 St. Paul
 St. Paul VI
 St. Pius X
 St. Raphael
 St. Rene Goupil
 St. Richard
 St. Rita
 St. Robert
 St. Roch
 St. Rose Of Lima
 St. Sebastian
 St. Simon
 St. Stephen
 St. Sylvester
 St. Theresa Shrine
 St. Thomas Aquinas
 St. Thomas More
 St. Timothy
 St. Ursula
 St. Victor
 St. Vincent de Paul
 St. Wilfrid
 Stella Maris
 Sts. Cosmas and Damian
 The Divine Infant
 The Holy Trinity
 Transfiguration of Our Lord
 Venerable John Merlini

Secondary schools

 Bishop Allen
 Bishop Marrocco/Thomas Merton
 Brebeuf
 Chaminade
 Dante Alighieri
 Father Henry Carr
 Father John Redmond
 Francis Libermann
 James Cardinal McGuigan
 Loretto
 Loretto Abbey
 Madonna
 Marshall McLuhan
 Mary Ward
 Michael Power/St. Joseph
 Monsignor Percy Johnson
 Neil McNeil
 Notre Dame
 Senator O'Connor
 St. Basil-the-Great
 St. Joan of Arc
 St. John Henry Newman
 St. John Paul II
 St. Joseph's
 St. Joseph's Morrow Park
 St. Mary
 St. Mother Teresa
 St. Oscar Romero
 St. Patrick

 De La Salle College

Combined schools
 Cardinal Carter
 St. Michael's Choir

Alternative schools
 A.P.P.L.E
 Monsignor Fraser

Future schools
 Baycrest Public School (pending negotiations with the TDSB)
 St. John Henry Newman Catholic High School — 2685 Kingston Road, former Scarboro Missions (opening January 6, 2025)
 Bridgeport/Lawrence (co-owner with TDSB)
 MacAshpalt (Progress/Sheppard)
 Nelson A. Boylen Collegiate Institute (pending negotiations with the TDSB)
 Regent Park/Duke of York Public School (demolished)
 Scarlett Heights Entrepreneurial Academy (pending negotiations with the TDSB)

Former schools
Previously the district operated French-language schools in addition to English-language schools. As of May 1980 the district operated five of the seven public French-language schools in Metropolitan Toronto, with the other two being operated by the North York Board of Education. The Metropolitan Separate School Board required any potential student to have at least one French-speaking parent before being admitted to a French-speaking school. One of the francophone schools operated by the board was the Ecole Sacre Coeur, which first opened in 1891 in a building basement and moved to its own facility in 1896. In the year it started, Toronto had 130 francophone families.

Meanwhile, the Board operated and funded two schools that they were part of since 1967 namely De La Salle College and St. Michael's College School. The schools, however, were re-privatized in 1985 and 1994 (although De La Salle spent almost 7 years with the board). In addition, three high schools such as Brother Edmund Rice, Marian Academy, and Regina Pacis were run by the Metropolitan Separate School Board. Both schools were closed between 2001 and 2002 due to low enrollment and the facilities were later reused. Also there was a Don Bosco which was also closed in 2017 due to low enrollment and as well was reused.

See also
List of educational institutions in Etobicoke
List of educational institutions in Scarborough
List of schools in the Conseil scolaire catholique MonAvenir
List of schools in the Conseil scolaire Viamonde
List of schools in the Toronto District School Board

References

Toronto Catholic District School Board
Toronto Catholic District School Board
Toronto
Schools of the Toronto Catholic District School Board